There were several Mongol invasions of Tibet. The earliest is the alleged plot to invade Tibet by Genghis Khan in 1206, which is considered anachronistic; there is no evidence of Mongol-Tibetan encounters prior to the military campaign in 1240. The first confirmed campaign is the invasion of Tibet by the Mongol general Doorda Darkhan in 1240, a campaign of 30,000 troops that resulted in 500 casualties. The campaign was smaller than the full-scale invasions used by the Mongols against large empires. The purpose of this attack is unclear, and is still in debate among Tibetologists. Then in the late 1240s Mongol prince Godan invited Sakya lama Sakya Pandita, who urged other leading Tibetan figures to submit to Mongol authority. This is generally considered to have marked the beginning of Mongol rule over Tibet, as well as the establishment of patron and priest relationship between Mongols and Tibetans. These relations were continued by Kublai Khan, who founded the Mongol Yuan dynasty and granted authority over whole Tibet to Drogon Chogyal Phagpa, nephew of Sakya Pandita. The Sakya-Mongol administrative system and Yuan administrative rule over the region lasted until the mid-14th century, when the Yuan dynasty began to crumble.

In the early 17th century, the Oirat Mongols again conquered the region and established the Khoshut Khanate. Since then the Mongols had intervened in Tibetan politics until the Qing conquest of Mongolia and Dzungaria.

Invasion

Prior to 1240
According to one traditional Tibetan account, the Mongol emperor Genghis Khan plotted to invade Tibet in 1206, but was dissuaded when the Tibetans promised to pay tribute to the Mongols. Modern scholars consider the account to be anachronistic and factually wrong. Genghis' campaign was targeted at the Tangut kingdom of Western Xia, not Tibet, and there was certainly no tribute being paid to the Mongols prior to 1240. There is no evidence of interaction between the two nations prior to Doorda Darkhan's invasion in 1240.

The earliest real Mongol contact with the ethnic Tibetan people came in 1236, when a Tibetan chief near Wenxian submitted to the Mongols campaigning against the Jin dynasty in Sichuan.

1240-1241 invasion 

In 1240, the Mongol Prince Godan, Ögedei's son and Güyük's younger brother, "delegated the command of the Tibetan invasion to the Tangut general, Doorda Darqan (Dor-ta)". The expedition was "the first instance of military conflict between the two nations". The attack consisted of 30,000 men (possibly much smaller than that) and resulted in 500 casualties, along with the burning of the Kadampa monasteries of Rwa-sgreṅ and Rgyal-lha-khang. The campaign was smaller than the full-scale invasions used by the Mongols against large empires. According to Turrell V. Wylie, that much is in agreement among Tibetologists. However, the purpose of invasion is disputed among Tibetan scholars, partly because of the abundance of anachronistic and factually erroneous sources.

However, modern studies find that the oldest sources credit the Mongol scouts with burning Rgyal-lha-khang only, while a large number of Rwa-sgreng monks were slain. The bKa’-brgyud-pa monasteries of sTag-lung and
’Bri-gung, with their old link to the Western Xia dynasty, were spared because Doorda himself was a Tangut Buddhist. The
’Bri-gung abbot or, according to Petech, the Rwa-sgreng abbot, suggested the Mongols had invited the Sakya hierarch, Sakya Pandita. After he met Godan, Sakya Pandita died there leaving his two nephews. Sakya Pandita convinced other monasteries in Central Tibet to align with the Mongols. The Mongols kept them as hostages referring symbolic surrender of Tibet.

One view, considered the most traditional, is that the attack was a retaliation on Tibet caused by the Tibetan refusal to pay tribute. Wylie points out that the Tibetans stopped paying tribute in 1227, while Doorda Darkhan's invasion was in 1240, suggesting that the Mongols, not known for their empathy, would not wait over a decade to respond. The text from which this claim is based on also makes other anachronistic mistakes, insisting that Genghis was planning to attack Tibet prior to Doorda Darkhan's invasion, when the real campaign was against the Tangut kingdom of Western Xia.

Another theory, supported by Wylie, is that the military action was a reconnaissance campaign meant to evaluate the political situation in Tibet. The Mongols hoped to find a single monarch with whom they could threaten into submission, but instead found a Tibet that was religiously and politically divided, without a central government.

A third view is that the troops were sent as raids and "looting parties", and that the goal of the campaign was to pillage the "wealth amassed in the Tibetan monasteries". This is disputed, as the Mongols deliberately avoided attacking certain monasteries, a questionable decision if their only goal was profit.

Whatever the purpose of the invasion, the Mongols withdrew in 1241, as all the Mongol princes were recalled back to Mongolia in preparation for the appointment of a successor to Ogedai Khan. In 1244, the Mongols returned to Tibet. They invited Sakya Pandita to Godan's camp, where he agreed to capitulate Tibet, after the Mongols threatened a full-scale invasion of the region.

1244 invasion under Möngke Khan

Sa-skya Pandita died in 1251 and his master Godan Khan possibly died at the same time (or, according to other sources, after 1253). Möngke Khan became Khagan in the same year. Some sources say there was a Mongolian invasion in 1251, in retribution for a failure to pay tribute, or in 1251-2 'to take formal possession of the country'. In order to strengthen his control over Tibet, Möngke made Qoridai commander of the Mongol and Han troops in Turpan in 1251. Two attacks are mentioned, one led by Dörbetei, the other by Qoridai, and the double campaign struck fear into the Tibetans. Tibetan sources however only mention an attack on a place called  Bod kyi-mon-mkhar-mgpon-po-gdong. Wyle is sceptical however of all of these sources, arguing that the lack of substantive evidence for an invasion raises doubts about the extent of Mongol movements in Tibet proper.' He concludes:-
"Excluding the 1252 attack against the unidentified Mon-mkmar-mgon-po-gdong mentioned earlier, there seems to be no evidence to prove the presence of Mongol troops in central Tibet during the two decades that 'Phags-pa Lama was away from Sa-skya (1244-65). During those years, external campaigns of conquest and internal feuds between scions of the sons of Chinggis Khan occupied the attention of the Mongols. Tibet, whose formidable terrain was politically fragmented by local lords and lamas, posed no military threat to the Mongols, and it was all but ignored by them." 

In 1252-53 Qoridai invaded Tibet, reaching as far as Damxung. The Central Tibetan monasteries submitted to the Mongols. Möngke divided the lands of Tibet between his relatives as their appanages in accordance with Great Jasag of Genghis Khan. Many Mongol aristocrats including Khagan himself seem to have sought blessings of prominent Tibetan lamas. Möngke Khan patronized Karma Baqshi (1204–83) of the Karma-pa suborder and the ’Bri-gung Monastery, while Hulagu, khan of the Mongols in the Middle East, sent lavish gifts to both ’Bri-gung and the Phag-mo-gru-pa suborder's gDan-sa-thel monastery. Later William Rubruck reports that he saw Chinese, Tibetan, and Indian Buddhist monks at the capital city, Karakorum, of the Mongol Empire.

Although, Karmapa of the Karma Kagyu school politely refused to stay with him, preferring his brother the Khagan, in 1253 Prince Kubilai summoned to his court the Sa-skya-pa hierarch's two nephews, Blo-gros rGyal-mtshan, known as ’Phags-Pa lama (1235–80), and Phyag-na rDo-rje (1239-67) from the late Godan's ordo in Liangzhou. Khubilai Khan first met 'Phags-pa lama in 1253, presumably to bring the Sa-skya lama who resided in Köden's domain, and who was a symbol of Tibetan surrender, to his own camp. At first Kublai remained shamanist, but his chief khatun, Chabui (Chabi), converted to Buddhism and influenced Kublai's religious view. During Kublai's expedition into Yunnan, his number two, Uriyangkhadai, had to station in Tibet in 1254-55 possibly to suppress war-like tribes in Tibet. Hulegu appointed his representative, Kokochu, in Tibet in mid-1250s while marching towards Iran. Since then, the Ilkhans had had possessions in Tibet.

In 1265 Qongridar ravaged the Tufan/mDo-smad area, and from 1264 to 1275 several campaigns pacified the Tibetan and Yi peoples of Xifan around modern Xichang. By 1278 Mongol myriarchies: tumens and postroads reached through  as far west as Litang.

Aftermath

Tibet was subdued to the Mongol Empire under Mongolian administrative rule, but the region was granted with a degree of political autonomy. Kublai Khan would later include Tibet into his Yuan dynasty, and the region remained administratively separate from the conquered provinces of Song dynasty China.

According to the Tibetan traditional view, the khan and the lama established "priest-patron" relations. This meant administrative management and military assistance from the khan and assistance from the lama in spiritual issues. Tibet was conquered by the Mongols before the Mongol invasion of South China. After the conquest of the Song dynasty, Kublai Khan consolidated Tibet into the new Yuan dynasty, but Tibet was administrated under the Bureau of Buddhist and Tibetan Affairs (Xuanzheng Yuan), separate from the Chinese provinces. The Mongols granted the Sakya lama a degree political authority, but retained control over the administration and military of the region.
As efforts to rule both territories while preserving Mongol identity, Kublai Khan prohibited Mongols from marrying Chinese, but left both the Chinese and Tibetan legal and administrative systems intact. Though most government institutions established by Kublai Khan in his court resembled the ones in earlier Chinese dynasties, Tibet never adopted the imperial examinations or Neo-Confucian policies.

Buddhist monks from Tibet were popular and well respected in Mongol-ruled Iran (the Ilkhanate), Mongolia, China (the Yuan) and Central Asia (the Chagatai Khanate). Towards the end of the Yuan dynasty in the mid-14th century, Tibet regained its independence from the Mongols.

Post imperial expedition

The Oirats converted to Tibetan Buddhism around 1615, and it was not long before they became involved in the conflict between the Gelug and Karma Kagyu schools. At the request of the Gelug school, in 1637, Güshi Khan, the leader of the Khoshuts in Koko Nor, defeated Choghtu Khong Tayiji (1581-1637), the Khalkha prince who supported the Karma Kagyu school.

Tsogtu Khuntaiji had established a base on the Tuul river. Known as an intellectual, he embraced the Karma sect and built monasteries and castles. He submitted himself to Ligdan Khan, last grand khan of the Mongols. He took part in Ligdan's campaign to Tibet to help the Karma sect although Ligdan Khan died in 1634 before they joined. But Tsogtu pursued the campaign. In the same year he conquered the Tümed around Kokonor (Qinghai Lake) and moved his base there. By request from Shamar Rabjampa he sent an army under his son Arslan to central Tibet in 1635. However, Arslan attacked his ally, the Tsang army. He met the fifth Dalai Lama and paid homage to Gelukpa monasteries instead of destroying them. Arslan was eventually assassinated by Choghtu's order.

The Geluk sect asked for help Törü Bayikhu (Güshi Khan), the leader of the Khoshut tribe of the Oirat confederation. In 1636 Törö Bayikhu led the Khoshuts and the Dzungars to Tibet. In the next year a decisive war between Tsogtu Khuntaiji and Törü Bayikhu ended in the latter's victory and Tsoghtu was killed.

He has traditionally been portrayed as evil by the Geluk sect. On the other hand, the Mongolian movie "Tsogt taij" (1945) treated him as a national hero. It reflected the communist regime's attitude toward Tibetan Buddhism.

With his crushing victory over Tsogtu, Güshi Khan conquered Amdo (present-day Qinghai). The unification of Tibet followed in 1641–42, when Güshi Khan invaded Central Tibet and defeated the indigenous Tsangpa Dynasty. After his victory he was proclaimed (chogyal), i.e. the King of Dharma, or Teaching, by the Fifth Dalai Lama. With these events the establishment of a Khoshut Khanate was confirmed. Gushi khan granted to the Dalai Lama authority over Tibet from Dartsedo to Ladakh. The title "Dalai Lama" itself had previously been bestowed upon the third lama of the Gelug tulku lineage by Altan Khan (not to be confused with the Altan Khans of the Khalkha), and means, in Mongolian, "Ocean of Wisdom."

Resurfacing of the struggle between Dzungar Khanate and Qing dynasty

Intervention in Tibet

Amdo, meanwhile, became home to the Khoshuts. The descendants of Güshi Khan continued to rule as Dharma kings (chogyals) of Tibet, although they were eclipsed by the Dalai Lama and his regent for long periods. In 1717, however, the Dzungars, led by Tsewang Rabtan's brother Tsering Dondup, invaded Tibet. The invaders defeated and killed Lha-bzang Khan (the last khan of the Khoshut Khanate), a great-grandson of Güshi Khan and the fifth Dharma king of Tibet. The Dzungars deposed a pretender to the position of the Dalai Lama who had previously been promoted by Lha-bzang Khan. The 5th Dalai Lama had encouraged Mongolian lamas to prevent any non-dGe-lugs-pa teaching among the Mongols. The Dzungars soon began to loot Lhasa, thus losing initial Tibetan goodwill towards them. Many Nyingmapa and Bonpos were executed and Tibetans visiting Dzungar officials were forced to stick their tongues out so the Dzungars could tell if the person recited constant mantras (which was said to make the tongue black or brown). This allowed them to pick the Nyingmapa and Bonpos, who recited many magic-mantras. This habit of sticking one's tongue out as a mark of respect on greeting someone has remained a Tibetan custom until recent times.

The Dzungar invasion was a challenge to the imperial policy of the Kangxi Emperor, since Lha-bzang Khan had been allied to the Qing dynasty. The Emperor retaliated in 1718, but his military expedition suffered inadequate logistics and was annihilated by the Dzungars at the Battle of the Salween River not far from Lhasa. A second and larger expedition was dispatched by the Emperor and met with rapid success. The Manchus expelled Tsewang Rabtan's force from Tibet in 1720 and the troops were hailed as liberators. They brought Kälzang Gyatso with them from Kumbum to Lhasa and he was installed as the 7th Dalai Lama in 1721. In 1723 Lobzang Danjin, another descendant of Güshi Khan, defended Amdo against Qing dynasty's attempts to extend its rule into Tibet, but was crushed in the following year. Thus, Amdo fell under Chinese domination.

See also 
 Tibet under Yuan rule
 Chinese expedition to Tibet (1720)

References

Citations

Sources 

 
 Laird, Thomas. The Story of Tibet: Conversations with the Dalai Lama (2006) Grove Press. 
 Rossabi, Morris. China Among Equals: The Middle Kingdom and Its Neighbors, 10th-14th Centuries (1983) Univ. of California Press. 
 Sanders, Alan J. K.  Historical dictionary of Mongolia (2003) Scarecrow Press. 
 Saunders, John Joseph. The history of the Mongol conquests. (2001) University of Pennsylvania Press. 
 Shakabpa, W.D. Tibet: A Political History. (1967) Yale University Press. 
 Smith, Warren W., Jr. Tibetan Nation: A History Of Tibetan Nationalism And Sino-tibetan Relations (1997) Westview Press. 
 Wylie, Turrell V.  The First Mongol Conquest of Tibet Reinterpreted Harvard Journal of Asiatic Studies, vol. 37, no. 1, 1977, pp. 103–133. 

Military history of Tibet
Military history of Mongolia
Wars involving the Mongol Empire
13th-century conflicts
13th century in Tibet
17th-century conflicts
17th century in Tibet
18th-century conflicts
18th century in Tibet
History of Tibet
Tibet
Tibet
Invasions of Tibet
Tibet